OPL may stand for:

Computing and technology 
 Open Programming Language
 Optical path length
 Optimization Programming Language, a modelling language designed for the CPLEX Optimization software
 FM Operator Type-L, a series of sound chips made by Yamaha:
 YM3526 (OPL)
 YM3812 (OPL2)
 YMF262 (OPL3)
 YMF278 (OPL4)

Libraries 
 Oakville Public Library, in Oakville, Ontario
 Oshawa Public Library, in Oshawa, Ontario
 Ottawa Public Library, in Ottawa, Ontario
 One-person library
 Omaha Public Library, in Omaha, Nebraska

Sports 
 Oceanic Pro League, a former professional League of Legends league in Oceania
 Oman Professional League, an association football league in Oman

Other 
 Luxembourg Philharmonic Orchestra, abbreviated to OPL
 On Patrol: Live, an American docuseries that uses the abbreviation OPL
 Optique & Précision de Levallois (1911-1964), a former French optical company
 Open Publication License, license predating Creative Commons licenses
 Operating lease
 Organisation du Peuple en Lutte ("Struggling People's Organization"), a Haitian political party